Antoine Kouassi Koffi (Parma, 15 January 1999) is an Italian rugby union player.
His usual position is as a Flanker and he currently plays for Colorno in Top10.

In 2018–19 Pro14 and 2020–21 Pro14 seasons, he was named as Additional Player for Zebre.  

In 2018 and 2019, Koffi was named in the Italy Under 20 squad.

References

External links 
It's Rugby English Profile
Ultimate Rugby Profile

1999 births
Living people
Italian rugby union players
Rugby union flankers
Zebre Parma players
Rugby Colorno players